Shadmot Mehola is an Israeli settlement in the West Bank, organized as a national-religious moshav shitufi. Located in the Beit She'an Valley, it falls under the jurisdiction of Bik'at HaYarden Regional Council.

The international community considers Israeli settlements in the West Bank illegal under international law, but the Israeli government disputes this.

History
The village was established as a Nahal settlement named Shelah in 1979, and was converted to a civilian settlement by residents of Mehola in 1984. As Mehola itself it was named after the biblical city of Abel-meholah, which was located in the area.

References

Moshavim
Religious Israeli settlements
Nahal settlements
Populated places established in 1979
1979 establishments in the Israeli Military Governorate
Israeli settlements in the West Bank